Faith Baptist College (FBC) is a private, Christian, coeducational secondary school. It is located in the Old GRA neighborhood of Port Harcourt, the Rivers State capital. It is owned and operated by the Faith Baptist Church of the Nigerian Baptist Convention. Its motto is "Excellence, Discipline and Fear of God."

History
The school was founded on 9 October 2000. It started with only 13 students in the first year of admissions. Initially, teachers were brought from the Faith Baptist Senior Primary School. Full-time teaching staff arrived during the second year.

Administration
The first principal of the school was Rev. Ibioseya D. Amachree. The current principal is Charles Akah.

Faith Baptist College has a school management board, and is managed based on policy frameworks formulated by this board.

Facilities
One of the school's major priorities is to provide facilities for students, as well as all citizens aspiring for secondary school education. Facilities include: Science laboratories for physics, chemistry and biological studies. Others are home economics, creative arts, basic technology workshops, along with a functional library and ICT training rooms.

References

External links

Schools in Port Harcourt
Educational institutions established in 2000
Secondary schools in Rivers State
2000 establishments in Nigeria
2000s establishments in Rivers State
Old GRA, Port Harcourt
Baptist schools in Nigeria